In enzymology, an UDP-N-acetylglucosamine 4-epimerase is an enzyme that catalyzes the chemical reaction

UDP-N-acetyl-D-glucosamine  UDP-N-acetyl-D-galactosamine

Hence, this enzyme has one substrate, UDP-N-acetyl-D-glucosamine, and one product, UDP-N-acetyl-D-galactosamine.

This enzyme belongs to the family of isomerases, specifically those racemases and epimerases acting on carbohydrates and derivatives.  The systematic name of this enzyme class is UDP-N-acetyl-D-glucosamine 4-epimerase. Other names in common use include UDP acetylglucosamine epimerase, uridine diphosphoacetylglucosamine epimerase, uridine diphosphate N-acetylglucosamine-4-epimerase, and uridine 5'-diphospho-N-acetylglucosamine-4-epimerase.  This enzyme participates in aminosugars metabolism.

Structural studies

References 

 
 

EC 5.1.3
Enzymes of known structure